The Image Cytometry Standard (ICS) is a digital multidimensional image file format used in life sciences microscopy. It stores not only the image data, but also the microscopic parameters describing the optics during the acquisition.

ICS was first proposed in: P. Dean, L. Mascio, D. Ow, D. Sudar, J. Mullikin, Proposed standard for image cytometry data files, Cytometry, n. 11, pp. 561-569, 1990 .

The original ICS file format actually uses two separate files: a text header file with .ics extension and other, much bigger and with the actual image data, with .ids extension. This allows the compression of the data while leaving the header file accessible. On the other hand, the newer ICS2 file format uses only one single .ics file with both the header and the data together.

The .ics in the two-file format is a text file with fields separated by tabs, and lines ending with a newline character. In the newer ICS2 format this text header precedes the binary data.

The ICS format is capable of storing:
 multidimensional and multichannel data
 images in 8, 16, 32 or 64 bit integer, 32 or 64 bit floating point and floating point complex data
 all microscopic parameters directly relevant to the image formation
 free-form comments

External links

 Sources for an ICS file reader/writer library released under the LGPL v2.1 license: https://github.com/svi-opensource/libics. Current version is 1.6.5 released August 18, 2021.
 Python interface to libics: pylibics
 ICS opener for ImageJ.
 Bio-Formats for Fiji_(software) / ImageJ.

Graphics file formats
Metadata